Don McKinnon is the New Zealand former Deputy Prime Minister and former Secretary-General of the Commonwealth of Nations.

Don McKinnon may also refer to:

Don McKinnon (rugby league) (born 1955), Australian rugby league footballer
Donald McKinnon (Canadian politician) (1901–1976), Alberta MLA from 1940 to 1944
Donnie McKinnon (born 1940), Scottish footballer

See also
Donald MacKinnon (disambiguation)